Jay Stern more commonly known as "Jay from L.A." is an American film producer. He currently resides in New York City but frequently does business in Los Angeles.

Filmography 
He was a producer in all films unless otherwise noted.

Film 

Miscellaneous crew

Thanks

References

External links 

Living people
American film producers
Year of birth missing (living people)